Nélson Carlos Ferreira Júnior (born 1 January 1973 in Barbosa Ferraz, Paraná) is a retired Brazilian athlete who specialised in the long jump. He represented his country at the 1996 and 2000 Summer Olympics. In addition, he competed in three consecutive World Championships starting in 1993, his best result being the fifth place at the 1997 edition.

Competition record

Personal bests
Outdoor
100 metres – 10.64 (+1.6 m/s) (Americana 2001)
Long jump – 8.36 (+0.8 m/s) (Medellín 1996)
Triple jump – 15.17 (1994)
Indoor
Long jump – 7.58 (Paris 1997)

References

1973 births
Living people
Brazilian male long jumpers
Athletes (track and field) at the 1999 Pan American Games
Athletes (track and field) at the 1996 Summer Olympics
Athletes (track and field) at the 2000 Summer Olympics
Olympic athletes of Brazil
Pan American Games athletes for Brazil
Sportspeople from Paraná (state)
World Athletics Championships athletes for Brazil
South American Games gold medalists for Brazil
South American Games medalists in athletics
Competitors at the 1994 South American Games
20th-century Brazilian people
21st-century Brazilian people